Carr may refer to:

Geography

United States
 Carr, Colorado, an unincorporated community
 Carr, North Carolina, an unincorporated community
 Carr Township, Clark County, Indiana
 Carr Township, Jackson County, Indiana
 Carr Township, Durham County, North Carolina
 Carr Inlet, Washington state
 Carr River, Rhode Island
 Carr Valley, Wisconsin

Elsewhere
 Carr (landform), a north European wetland, a fen overgrown with trees
 Carr, South Yorkshire, England, United Kingdom
 Cape Carr, Wilkes Land, Antarctica
 Mount Carr, Canada

Companies
 Carr Amplifiers, manufacturer of guitar amplifiers, United States
 Carr Bank, hamlet in Cumbria, England, United Kingdom
 Carr Communications, Ireland
 Carrier Global (New York Stock Exchange symbol CARR), American manufacturer of HVAC systems

People and fictional characters
 Carr (given name), includes a list of people with the given name
 Carr (surname), includes list of people and fictional characters with the surname

Other uses
 , a US Navy frigate
 Carr Center for Human Rights Policy, a research center of the Kennedy School of Government at Harvard University
 Carr baronets, an extinct title in the Baronetage of England

See also
 Carr Fire, a fire in the Redding, California area in 2018
 Carr index, an indicator of the compressibility of a powder
 Carr's, English manufacturers of water biscuits
 Car (disambiguation)
 KARR (disambiguation)
 Carrs (disambiguation)